Ceyuan haijing is a treatise on solving geometry problems with the algebra of Tian yuan shu written by the mathematician Li Zhi in 1248 in the time of the Mongol Empire. It is a collection of 692 formula and 170 problems, all derived from the same master diagram of a round town inscribed in a right triangle and a square. They often involve two people who walk on straight lines until they can see each other, meet or reach a tree or pagoda in a certain spot. It is an algebraic geometry book, the purpose of book is to study intricated geometrical relations by algebra.

Majority of the geometry problems are solved by polynomial equations, which are represented using a method called tian yuan shu, "coefficient array method" or literally "method of the celestial unknown". Li Zhi is the earliest extant source of this method, though it was known before him in some form. It is a positional system of rod numerals to represent polynomial equations.

Ceyuan haijing was first introduced to the west by the British Protestant Christian missionary to China, Alexander Wylie in his book Notes on Chinese Literature, 1902. He wrote:

This treatise consists of 12 volumes.

Volume 1

Diagram of a Round Town 

The monography begins with a master diagram called the Diagram of Round Town(圆城图式). It shows a circle inscribed in a right angle triangle and four horizontal lines, four vertical lines.
 TLQ, the large right angle triangle, with horizontal line LQ, vertical line TQ and hypotenuse TL
C: Center of circle:
NCS: A vertical line through C, intersect the circle and line LQ at N(南north side of city wall),  intersects south side of circle at S(南).
NCSR, Extension of line NCS to intersect hypotenuse TL at R(日)
WCE: a horizontal line passing center C, intersects circle and line TQ at W(西, west side of city wall) and circle at E (东, east side of city wall).
WCEB:extension of line WCE to intersect hypotenuse at B(川)
KSYV: a horizontal tangent at S, intersects line TQ at K(坤), hypotenuse TL at Y(月).
HEMV: vertical tangent of circle at point E, intersects line LQ at H, hypotenuse at M(山, mountain)
HSYY, KSYV, HNQ, QSK form a square, with inscribed circle C.
Line YS, vertical line from Y intersects line LQ at S(泉,  spring)
Line BJ, vertical line from point B, intersects line LQ at J(夕, night)
RD, a horizontal line from R, intersects line TQ at D(旦, day)

The North, South, East and West direction in Li Zhi's diagram are opposite to our present convention.

Triangles and their sides 

There are a total of fifteen right angle triangles formed by the intersection between triangle TLQ, the four horizontal lines, and four vertical lines.

The names of these right angle triangles and their sides are summarized in the following table

In problems from Vol 2 to Vol 12, the names of these triangles are used in very terse terms. For instance

"明差","MING difference" refers to the "difference between the vertical side and horizontal side of MING triangle.
"叀差","ZHUANG difference" refers to the "difference between the vertical side and horizontal side of ZHUANG triangle."
"明差叀差并" means "the sum of MING difference and ZHUAN difference"

Length of Line Segments 

This section (今问正数) lists the length of line segments, the sum and difference and their combinations in the diagram of round town, given that the radius r of inscribe circle is  paces ,.

The 13 segments of ith triangle (i=1 to 15) are:

 Hypoteneuse 
 Horizontal  
 Vertical    
 :勾股和 :sum of horizontal and vertical 
 :勾股校: difference of vertical and horizontal 
 :勾弦和: sum of horizontal and hypotenuse 
 :勾弦校: difference of hypotenuse and horizontal 
 :股弦和: sum of hypotenuse and vertical 
 :股弦校: difference of hypotenuse and vertical 
 :弦校和: sum of the difference and the hypotenuse 
 :弦校校: difference of the hypotenuse and the difference 
 :弦和和: sum the hypotenuse and the sum of vertical and horizontal 
 :弦和校: difference of the sum of horizontal and vertical with the hypotenuse 

Among the fifteen right angle triangles, there are two sets of identical triangles:

=,
=
that is
;
;
;
;
;
;

Segment numbers 

There are 15 x 13 =195 terms, their values are shown in Table 1:

Definitions and formula

Miscellaneous formula 

 = *
 = 
 = 
 = 
 = 
 = 
 = 
 = 
 = 
 = =

The Five Sums and The Five Differences 

 
 
 
 
 
 
 
 
 
 
 
 
 
 

Li Zhi derived a total of 692 formula in Ceyuan haijing. Eight of the formula are incorrect, the rest are all correct

From vol 2 to vol 12, there are 170 problems, each problem utilizing a selected few from these formula to form 2nd order to 6th order polynomial equations. As a matter of fact, there are 21 problems yielding third order polynomial equation, 13 problem yielding 4th order polynomial equation and one problem yielding 6th order polynomial

Volume 2 

This volume begins with a general hypothesis

All subsequent 170 problems are about given several segments, or their sum or difference, to find the radius or diameter of the round town. All problems follow more or less the same format; it begins with a Question, followed by description of algorithm, occasionally followed by step by step description of the procedure.

Nine types of inscribed circle
The first ten problems were solved without the use of Tian yuan shu. These problems are related to
various types of inscribed circle.
Question 1 Two men A and B start from corner Q. A walks eastward 320 paces and stands still. B walks southward 600 paces and see B. What is the diameter of the circular city ?
Answer: the diameter of the round town is 240 paces.
This is inscribed circle problem associated with 
Algorithm:

Question 2Two men A and B start from West gate. B walks eastward 256 paces, A walks south 480 paces and sees B. What is the diameter of the town ?
Answer 240 paces
This is inscribed circle problem associated with 
From Table 1, 256 = ; 480 =
Algorithm:

Question 3inscribed circle problem associated with 

Question 4：inscribed circle problem associated with 

Question 5：inscribed circle problem associated with 

Question 6

Question 7

Question 8

Question 9

Question 10

Tian yuan shu 

From problem 14 onwards, Li Zhi introduced "Tian yuan one" as unknown variable, and set up two expressions according to Section Definition and formula, then equate these two tian yuan shu expressions. He then solved the problem and obtained the answer.

Question 14:"Suppose a man walking out from West gate and heading south for 480 paces and encountered a tree. He then walked out from the North gate heading east for 200 paces and saw the same tree. What is the radius of the round own?"
Algorithm: Set up the radius as Tian yuan one, place the counting rods representing southward 480 paces on the floor, subtract the tian yuan radius to obtain

：

元
。

Then subtract tian yuan from eastward paces 200 to obtain:

元

multiply these two expressions to get：

元

元

that is

thus：

元

Solve the equation and obtain

Volume 3 

17 problems associated with segment i.e TW in 
In other words, for example, change  of problem 2 in vol 3 into  turns it into problem 2 of Vol 4.

Volume 4 

17 problems, given and a second segment, find diameter of circular city.
。

Volume 5 

18 problems, given。

Volume 6 

18 problems.
Q1-11，13-19 given，and a second line segment, find diameter d.
Q12：given and another line segment, find diameter d.

Volume 7 

18 problems, given two line segments find the diameter of round town

Volume 8 

17 problems, given three to eight segments or their sum or difference, find diameter of round city.

Problem 14 

Given the sum of GAO difference and MING difference is 161 paces and the sum of MING difference and ZHUAN difference is 77 paces. What is the diameter of the round city?
Answer: 120 paces.

Algorithm:

Given

：Add these two items, and divide by 2; according to #Definitions and formula, this equals to
HUANGJI difference:
 

Let Tian yuan one as the horizontal of SHANGPING (SG):
 
 =
 (#Definition and formula)
Since  (Definition and formula)

(diameter of round town),

Now, multiply the length of RZ by 

multiply it with the square of RS:

equate the expressions for the two 
thus

We obtain:

solve it and we obtain ;

This matches the horizontal of SHANGPING 8th triangle in #Segment numbers.

Volume 9 

Part I

Part II

Volume 10 

8 problems

Volume 11 

：Miscellaneous 18 problems：

Volume 12 

14 problems on fractions

Research 

In 1913, French mathematician L. van Hoe wrote an article about Ceyuan haijing. In 1982, K. Chemla Ph.D thesis Etude du Livre Reflects des Mesuers du Cercle sur la mer de Li Ye. 1983, University of Singapore Mathematics Professor Lam Lay Yong: Chinese Polynomial Equations in the Thirteenth Century。

Footnotes

References 

Jean-Claude Martzloff, A History of Chinese Mathematics, Springer 1997 
Kong Guoping, Guide to Ceyuan haijing, Hubei Education Press 1966 孔国平. 《测圆海镜今导读》 《今问正数》 湖北教育出版社. 1995
Bai Shangshu: A Modern Chinese Translation of Li Yeh Ceyuan haijing. Shandong Education Press 1985李冶 著 白尚恕 译 钟善基 校. 《测圆海镜今译》 山东教育出版社. 1985
Wu Wenjun The Grand Series of History of Chinese Mathematics Vol 6 吴文俊主编 《中国数学史大系》 第六卷
 Li Yan, A Historic Study of Ceyuan haijing, collected works of Li Yan and Qian Baocong vol 8《李俨.钱宝琮科学史全集》卷8，李俨《测圆海镜研究历程考》

Chinese mathematics
1248 works
13th century in China